Milivoj is an old Slavic origin given name derived from elements: milo ("gracius, favour") + voj ("soldier, war"). Popular primarily in South Slavic states. The name may refer to:

Milivoj Ašner (1913–2011), a former police chief in the Independent State of Croatia
Milivoj Bebić (born 1959), Croatian water polo player
Milivoj Bračun (born 1958), a Croatian football manager
Milivoj Dukić (born 1993), Montenegrin sailor
Milivoj Jugin (1925–2013), Serbian aeronautical engineer, constructor, publicist and popularizer of science
Milivoj Karakašević (born 1948), Serbian table tennis player
Milivoj Krmar (born 1997), Serbian footballer
Milivoj Lajovic (1921–2008), an Australian politician of Slovene origin
Milivoj Petković (born 1949), a Bosnian-Croat army officer
Milivoj Radović (1915–1987), a Yugoslav Olympic fencer
Milivoj Solar (born 1936), a Croatian literary theoretician, literary historian, essayist and a university professor
Milivoj Uzelac (1897–1977), Croatian artist

See also
 Milivoje
 Milivojević
 Milivojevci
 Slavic names

External links
http://www.behindthename.com/name/milivoj

Slavic masculine given names
Croatian masculine given names
Czech masculine given names
Macedonian masculine given names
Montenegrin masculine given names
Slovak masculine given names
Slovene masculine given names
Serbian masculine given names